Paul Ackerman (February 18, 1908 – December 31, 1977) was an influential music journalist.

Ackerman was born in New York, New York. From 1943 to 1973 he was the music editor of Billboard magazine. He wrote the liner notes to Harry Belafonte's 1958 album of folk ballads, Love Is a Gentle Thing.

Personal life
Ackerman enjoyed "rural blues and country idioms".

Education
He obtained his degree from the College of William and Mary and Columbia University. He later received his master's degree in English.

Career
Ackerman worked as music editor for Billboard magazine from 1943 to 1973. He worked for Billboard magazine for a total of 47 years. He was among the first journalists to write on the newly created rock and roll genre. He was a scholar knowledgeable in European and American civilization. His work focused on popular music of all genres.

Awards and honors
Ackerman received a number of awards as a musical journalist and scholar. In 1995, he was inducted into the Rock and Roll Hall of Fame, in the non-performer category.

Bibliography
 Stambler, Irwin, & Grelun Landon (1969) The Encyclopedia of Folk, Country & Western Music, 1st ed., p. 3-4, (no ISBN) Amazon ASIN: B000RC4F16, LC: 67-10659 .
 Shemel, Sidney and M. William Krasilovsky, editor: Paul Ackerman (1964), ["This Business of Music"], (no ISBN) Amazon ASIN: B002KF9MLQ, LC: 64-25859 .

External links

References

1908 births
1977 deaths
20th-century American non-fiction writers
American magazine editors
Journalists from New York City